
Carthalo ("Saved by Melqart"; , Karthálōn; died around 209BC) was an officer in Hannibal's army during the Second Punic War.

Life
Carthalo led the Numidian cavalry in a successful skirmish against Rome. In 249, he assisted Adherbal during an attempt by the Romans headed by Publius Claudius Pulcher to take Drepana from the sea. He arrived in the city prior to the siege with 70 quinqueremes. His contribution was recognized for helping force the Romans to abandon the siege despite the superiority of the invading army. 

Following the Battle of Cannae, Hannibal sent Carthalo to Rome as a peace envoy. His delegation included a number of Roman prisoners whom the Carthaginians hoped to ransom. However,  the newly appointed Roman dictator M. Junius Pera sent a messenger to intercept Carthalo's delegation, telling them to leave by nightfall.

In 209BC, Carthalo was serving as garrison commander of Tarentum, which had fallen to Hannibal three years earlier, when Q. Fabius Maximus Verrucosus led a Roman force to retake the settlement. In the ensuing battle, when defeat seemed inevitable, Carthalo laid down his arms with the intention of surrendering to Fabius but was killed before he could make contact.

References

Citations

Bibliography
 . 
 . 
 .

See also
Melqart, the Canaanite deity
Battle of Drepana

Carthaginians
3rd-century BC births
200s BC deaths
Year of birth unknown
Year of death uncertain
3rd-century BC Punic people